Barrio Sur is a barrio (neighbourhood or district) of Montevideo, Uruguay.

Location
Barrio Sur is directly south of the Centro and is delimited by Canelones Str. on the North, Andes Str. on the West, the coastal avenue (the "Rambla") on the South and Dr Barrios Amorin Str. on the East. It is home to the Central Cemetery of Montevideo.

History
The history of Barrio Sur started around 1835 with the foundation of the cemetery. With the end of slavery in Uruguay, it became predominantly inhabited by Afro-Uruguayans. The first generation of liberated slaves started reviving some of the rituals of their countries of origin, which became known as Tangos or Tambos. From these rituals was born the Candombe. On 6 January, they held the ritual parade called "Llamad de los reyes" which honoured to the eldest members of the community. Later generations of Afro-Uruguayans gave up these rituals and focused rather on becoming integrated with the rest of the society of Montevideo. In more recent times, these rituals have been revived and have become an important part of the culture of Montevideo.

Culture

To this day, Barrio Sur remains very connected with the music of the Afro-Uruguayan culture. The barrio is central to the Carnival festivities and Candombe is regularly played during the weekends. Cultural centres include the Asociación Cultural C1080, which focuses on Candombe, the Asociación Cultural Tangó, La Casa del Vecino and the Sociedad de Gimnasia "L'Avenir".

See also 

Barrios of Montevideo

References

External links 
 Intendencia de Montevideo / Useful data / Barrio Sur
 Intendencia de Montevideo / Historia del Sur y Palermo
 Revista Raices / Historia del barrio Sur

 
Barrios of Montevideo